PL-1 or PL1 may refer to:

 PL/I, a programming language
 Lamson PL-1 Quark, a glider
 Pazmany PL-1, a trainer aircraft
 K-5 (missile)